A number of ships have been named Città di Savona, after the city of Savona in Italy.

, in service 1890-91
, sunk on 24 March 1943

Ship names